Kim Chil-bong (born 6 August 1961) is a South Korean weightlifter. He competed in the men's bantamweight event at the 1984 Summer Olympics.

References

1961 births
Living people
South Korean male weightlifters
Olympic weightlifters of South Korea
Weightlifters at the 1984 Summer Olympics
Place of birth missing (living people)
20th-century South Korean people